The Embassy of Sri Lanka in Tokyo is the diplomatic mission of Sri Lanka to Japan.  The official website of the Embassy of Sri Lanka in Tokyo - www.slembassyjapan.com.

References

External links
 

Sri Lanka
Tokyo
Japan–Sri Lanka relations